Ichneutica agorastis is a moth of the family Noctuidae. This species is endemic to New Zealand. This moth is similar in appearance to two other species in the genus but can be distinguished through the colour and size of its forewings. This species is found in the South Island and Stewart Island in open habitats in the subalpine zone. However in Southland I. agorastis can be found down to sea-level. Adult moths are on the wing between January and April. The life history and host species are unknown.

Taxonomy

This species was first described by Edward Meyrick in 1887 from specimens collected at Lake Guyon and Akaroa and named Mamestra agorastis. The male lectotype specimen, collected by Richard William Fereday at Lake Guyon, is held at the Natural History Museum, London. In 1988 John S. Dugdale, in his catalogue of New Zealand Lepidoptera, placed this species within the Graphania genus. In 2019 Robert Hoare undertook a major review of New Zealand Noctuidae species. During this review the genus Ichneutica was greatly expanded and Graphania Hampson, 1905 was subsumed into that genus as a synonym. As a result of this review, this species is now known as Ichneutica agrorastis.

Description 

Meyrick described this species as follows:

I. agorastis is very similar in appearance to I. hartii and has also been confused with I. alopa. I. agorastis can be distinguished from I. hartii as the former species normally has a larger wingspan. I. agorastis also has a more reddish tinge to their forewings in comparison to I. hartii whose forewings tend to have a purplish colouration. I. agorastis can be distingiushed from I. alopa as the former has more distinctive and paler crosslines on its forewings. The wingspan of I. agorastis is between 32 to 39 mm.

Distribution 
Ichneutica agorastis is endemic to New Zealand. It can be found in the South Island and Stewart Island, however the presence of this species in the North Island has yet to be confirmed.

Habitat 
This species can be found in subalpine zones in open habitats such as tussock grasslands but has been found as low as sea level in locations in Southland. Specimens have been collected in string mires.

Behaviour 
Adults of this species are on the wing from January to April.

Life history and host species 
The life history of this species is unknown as are the host species of its larvae.

References

Hadeninae
Moths of New Zealand
Endemic fauna of New Zealand
Moths described in 1921
Taxa named by Edward Meyrick
Endemic moths of New Zealand